Arthur Denny may refer to:

 Arthur Denny (1629–1673), Anglo-Irish politician
 Arthur Denny (politician) (1704–1742), Irish politician
 Arthur A. Denny (1822–1899), one of the founders of Seattle, Washington
 Arthur J. Denny, British Olympic cyclist